Eisner Peak is a peak rising to  at the west side of the terminus of Sumner Glacier,  south-southeast of Mount Blunt, on the east coast of the Antarctic Peninsula. The peak was photographed from the air by the Ronne Antarctic Research Expedition in 1947 and the U.S. Navy in 1966, and it was surveyed from the ground by the Falkland Islands Dependencies Survey of 1960–61. It was named in 1977 by the Advisory Committee on Antarctic Names for Glen Eisner, a United States Antarctic Research Program biologist at Palmer Station in 1975.

References 

Mountains of Graham Land
Bowman Coast